The 1903 Chicago Maroons football team was an American football team that represented the University of Chicago during the 1903 college football season. In their 12th season under head coach Amos Alonzo Stagg, the Maroons compiled a 12–2–1 record, finished in fourth place in the Western Conference with a 4–1–1 record against conference opponents, and outscored all opponents by a combined total of 413 to 61.

Schedule

Roster

Head Coach: Amos Alonzo Stagg (12th year at Chicago)

References

Chicago
Chicago Maroons football seasons
Chicago Maroons football